The 1988–89 New Jersey Devils season was the 15th season for the National Hockey League franchise that was established on June 11, 1974, and seventh season since the franchise relocated from Colorado prior to the 1982–83 NHL season. After appearing in the playoffs the previous season, the Devils finished in fifth place in the Patrick Division to miss the playoffs for the thirteenth time in franchise history.

Regular season

Season standings

Schedule and results

Playoffs
The 1988–89 season was a disappointing one for the Devils. Just a year after their cinderella 1987–88 campaign in which they fell one win short of reaching the Stanley Cup Final, the team failed to make the playoffs altogether, managing only a fifth-place finish in the Patrick Division with a roster largely intact from the previous season.

Player statistics

Forwards
Note: GP = Games played; G = Goals; A = Assists; Pts = Points; PIM = Penalties in minutes

Defensemen
Note: GP = Games played; G = Goals; A = Assists; Pts = Points; PIM = Penalties in minutes

Goaltending
Note: GP = Games played; W = Wins; L = Losses; T = Ties; SO = Shutouts; GAA = Goals against average

Awards and records

Transactions

Draft picks
The Devils' draft picks at the 1988 NHL Entry Draft.

Farm teams

See also
1988–89 NHL season

Notes

References

New Jersey Devils seasons
New Jersey Devils
New Jersey Devils
New Jersey Devils
New Jersey Devils
20th century in East Rutherford, New Jersey
Meadowlands Sports Complex